The 2005 Formula Nippon Championship was  contested over 9 rounds. 8 teams, 17 drivers competed. All teams had to use Lola B3/51 chassis and Mugen Honda (Mugen MF308) engines.

Teams and drivers

Calendar

All races were held in Japan.

Calendar changes

 The race in Sepang was dropped.
 Fuji returned with two races.

Championship standings

Drivers' Championship
Scoring system

Teams' Championship

External links
2005 Japanese Championship Formula Nippon

Formula Nippon
Super Formula
Nippon